Asadhya Aliya is a 1979 Indian Kannada-language film, directed by H. R. Bhargava and produced by Udaya Chandrika. The film stars Vishnuvardhan, Padmapriya, Manu and Dwarakish. The film has musical score by G. K. Venkatesh. The movie was remade in Telugu in 1981 by K. S. R. Das as Mayadari Alludu starring Krishna.

Cast

Vishnuvardhan as Ashok
Padmapriya as Aruna
Maanu as Shekar
Dwarakish
Balakrishna
Narasimharaju
Ramkumar
Shakti Prasad
Dheerendra Gopal 
Badrachalam
Shivaprakash
Bhatti Mahadevappa
Hanumanthachar
K. Vijaya as Lalitha, Aruna's friend
Uma Shivakumar as Shanta, Aruna's mother
H. P. Saroja 
Susheela Naidu
Halam

Soundtrack
The music was composed by G. K. Venkatesh.

References

External links
 
 

1979 films
1970s Kannada-language films
Films scored by G. K. Venkatesh
Films directed by H. R. Bhargava